Kobina Annan (born 1944) is a retired Ghanaian diplomat, economist and business consultant. He was Ghana's Ambassador to Morocco from 2002 to 2009. He is the brother of Kofi Annan and the uncle of Kojo Annan. Prior to serving as Ghana's Ambassador to Morocco, he had studied and worked with several companies in both the UK and the US for over 30 years.

Early life and education 
Kobina Annan is the son of  Henry Reginald Annan and the brother of the late former Secretary-General of the United Nations, Kofi Annan. Annan obtained a Bachelor of Arts degree in economics from Macalester College, St. Paul, Minnesota just like his elder brother Kofi Annan.

Career 
From 1972 to 2002, Annan served in different roles in capacities in both Ghana and in New York He served as Deputy Managing Director of Trillium International Inc., New York and also later as the Regional manager of the US company Globe Inspection Ltd. in London He also served as the Deputy head of the training program of the African American Institute, New York, for South Africa and later as the managing director of Marino Consulting Company Ltd, Accra.

In July 2002, he was appointed by President John Agyekum Kufuor to serve as Ghana's ambassador to the Kingdom of Morocco, stationed at Rabat. He served from 2002 to 2009. He presented his letter of credence to His Majesty King Mohammed VI of Morocco on 4 February 2009.

Annan is currently a member of Vital Capital, an impact investment and private equity fund focused on Sub-Saharan African.

Personal life 
Annan is married and has two adult children. He is the younger brother of Kofi Annan and the uncle of Ghanaian-Nigerian businessman Kojo Annan.

References 

1944 births
Ghanaian diplomats
Living people
Macalester College alumni
Ambassadors of Ghana to Morocco